Morgan Wandell is an American media executive and producer.  He is the head of international content development for Apple TV+. A "veteran of the streaming revolution," he previously held senior creative positions at Amazon, ABC, and Touchstone.  His credits include The Marvelous Mrs. Maisel,  The Man in the High Castle, Tom Clancy's Jack Ryan, Ugly Betty, Criminal Minds, Grey’s Anatomy, Goliath and Tehran.

Early life and education
Morgan Wandell was born in Fort Wayne, Indiana to Jeffrey and Charlotte Wandell. Along with his brother, Michael, he grew up in Champaign, Illinois, graduating from Centennial High School in 1989. He was the senior class president and a member of the competitive swim team at Centennial.

Wandell attended Claremont McKenna College where he graduated cum laude with a degree in economics in 1993. During the summer between his junior and senior year, he interned for Channel One News.

Career
Following his graduation, Wandell was hired by Channel One News, where he wrote, produced, and directed news features and series for a daily newscast. In 1996, he landed a creative executive role at Disney’s Touchstone Studios.  At Touchstone, he managed primetime series and supervised the development slate of producers such as Jerry Bruckheimer, David Hoberman, and Peter Tolan. His shows included Boy Meets World and Home Improvement as well as Ryan Murphy’s first series, Popular, for the WB. The Home Improvement writers named the fictitious network executive who cancelled Tool Time -- the show within the show -- Morgan Wandell.  ("There's no project...If you have any complaints about that, you might want to email Morgan Wandell at big-fat-zero-dot-com.")

In the late 90s, Touchstone was merged with ABC Studios, and in the wake of the merger, Wandell decided to pursue his interest developing streaming video programming. In August 1999 he was named VP of Development at DEN, a precursor to modern streaming services that "lead the convergence of Hollywood and Silicon Valley, as it worked to create a new TV-style entertainment medium delivered on the Internet."
. While at DEN, he supervised DEN's entertainment-based programming, oversaw the development and production of nonfiction video and animation, and helped to restructure the production operations and reduce its expenses.

In March 2000, DEN CEO Jim Ritts left the company to become CEO of Channel One, and recruited Wandell to return to Channel One as its head of programming.  He was promoted to president of programming the following year. There Wandell oversaw production of a daily newscast for 8 million young people and expanded its capabilities into production commitments with other outside networks, including the MTV documentary series Breaking It Down with Serena Altschul, the 9/11 special The Day It All Changed  for the WB, and investigative features on ABC News’ Nightline on underground Christian churches in China.

In 2004, Wandell was appointed senior vice president, drama at ABC Studios. Over the next four years he developed series including Ugly Betty, Private Practice, Criminal Minds, and Ghost Whisperer, and helped to launch Desperate Housewives and Grey's Anatomy. While Wandell was at ABC, the studio went from producing one returning drama to 17. In 2008, producer Greg Berlanti recruited him to run Berlanti Television,  which produced shows such as Brothers and Sisters, Eli Stone, Dirty Sexy Money, and No Ordinary Family.

In 2013, Wandell was named head of drama development at Amazon.  There, in addition to The Man in the High Castle,  Wandell helped to develop David E. Kelley's Goliath, starring Billy Bob Thornton; Amy Sherman-Palladino's The Marvelous Mrs. Maisel,  Tom Clancy's Jack Ryan,  Sneaky Pete, the anthology series Electric Dreams, Patriot, a cult hit, and the limited series A Very English Scandal. He was promoted to head of international series in 2016 as Prime Video expanded into more than 200 territories.   In that position he worked on co-productions such as The Widow with Kate Beckinsdale (UK), and a slate of originals such as Breathe, El Candito (produced in Mexico), and Inside Edge, Made In Heaven, Mirzapur and The Family Man (made in India).

In October 2017 Apple launched its video subscription service—later called Apple TV+—and Wandell was appointed head of international content. In October 2020, it was announced that Apple had greenlit Masters of the Air an international WWII television series by Steven Spielberg's Amblin Television and Tom Hanks' Playtone. It was the first series in which Apple served as the studio.  As of December 2020, the international programming slate also included Shantaram, Pachinko and Losing Alice.

Personal life
Wandell and his wife, Francine Li, were married in September 2018. He serves on the Friends of the Saban Community Clinic Board of Directors.

References

1971 births
Living people
Apple Inc. employees
People from Fort Wayne, Indiana
Claremont McKenna College alumni